is a Japanese manga series created by Morishige. The story features a fighting squad of six girls (Koi Koi Seven) belonging to the Gokō Academy who fight daily to protect the Earth's peace and future, as well as the hopeless Tanaka Tetsuro. Koi Koi Seven was serialized in Akita Shoten’s Champion Red line of magazines from 2002 to 2007. The series was adapted into a 13-episode anime television series which was broadcast between April 4, 2005, and June 26, 2005.

Plot
Tetsuro Tanaka is transferred to Gokoh Academy full of high expectations. However, expectations fade with a bad premonition the moment he steps onto the campus and finds all the students except him are girls. A series of strange events fall upon him. Then, six girls who are called Koi Koi Seven appear as his guardians. Army combat helicopters and anti-tank guns attack Tetsuro for no particular reason as he tries to survive each day in the academy. Surrounded by many girls he gets into trouble every day because he often sees them naked, usually by mistake. In the dorm the same problem continues with the Koi Koi 7 team walking around the house in their underwear. On top of this, Celonious 28 also chases after him all the time because she wants to be with him. As well, Asuka Yayoi feels jealous of him because she loves him and she doesn't want him to hang around with other girls, which is very difficult because he is the only boy in the school and the girls are after him all the time. In general each girl of the Koi Koi 7 team has secret feelings for Tetsuro but they don't show them.

Characters 

The school's only male student.

 The main heroine of the story, part of a group of girls who call themselves the "Koi Koi 7".

 One of Tetsuro's roommates, an expert at firearms.

Roommate of Tetsuro.

One of Tetsuro's roommates.

one of Tetsuro's roommates.

 One of Tetsuro's roommates.

Kozoma (people who joined the school in their senior year) This group includes all six girls in the Koi Koi 7, plus Tetsuro.

A mysterious girl with an eyepatch.

 The teacher, who also lives in the student dorm with Tetsuro and the Koi Koi 7 girls.

 The headmaster whoser mission is to stop Tetsuro's father.

 Grandchild of the school's founder, leader of the Gokoh Five gang.

 Second in command at the Gokoh Five.

 A member of the Gokoh Five.

 A member of the Gokoh Five.

 A member of the Gokoh Five.

 A student who is in love with Satou.

 Another student who is in love with Yamada.

Media

Manga 
Koi Koi Seven was first serialized in Akita Shoten‘s Champion Red magazine in 2002. The individual chapters were subsequently released in nine compiled tankōbon volumes, the last of which was released March 20, 2007.

Anime 
A 13-episode anime television series adaptation aired in Japan between April 2 and June 25 of 2005. The anime consisted of 2 short specials that were released with the DVDs in January 27, 2006.

List of episodes

References

External links
Official Homepage  (Archived)
Enoki Films (Archived)

2002 manga
2005 Japanese television series endings
Akita Shoten manga
Anime series based on manga
Comedy anime and manga
Discotek Media
Harem anime and manga
Shōnen manga
Works about hanafuda